Nailah Blackman (born 2 December 1997) is a Trinidadian singer and songwriter most strongly associated with the soca genre.  Nailah Blackman's grandfather, the late Garfield Blackman, also known as Lord Shorty or Ras Shorty I, invented the style of music known as Jamoo and is also credited with inventing soca as a means of reinvigorating calypso music. Her mother, Abbi Blackman, is a hit-making calypso star in her own right Nailah is the niece of Avion Blackman, lead singer of the Los Angeles-based Christian-reggae band Christafari, and Nehilet Blackman.

Nailah Blackman grew up influenced by the sound and artistry of the musical traditions of soca and calypso sounds. At the age of five, Blackman began singing regularly and entered her first Calypso competition two years later. Her professional career then began at the age of 11. She is not only classically trained in voice but also in various instruments including the guitar, keyboard and steelpan.

Early career
In 2016, Blackman performed her song "Runaway Train" for Movie Towne's Pixel Play showcase. This performance raised her national profile and helped to garner buzz in advance of her 2017 releases. Blackman collaborated with the internationally successful soca act Kes on the song "Workout," which became a massive hit during the 2017 Trinidad Carnival season and continues to enjoy lasting popularity. "Workout" took Blackman to the finals of the 2017 International Soca Monarch competition. 

Blackman also released "Baila Mami" in 2017, produced by Anson Pro Soverall. 

In 2018, the most popular of Blackman's songs were released, including "O' Lawd Oye", "Sokah" and "Badishh," the latter featuring the Jamaican dancehall singer Shenseea.

Her rising star earned her candidacy in BET's 2018 "Best New International Act" viewer's choice competition.

In August 2019, she released her debut EP “The Reel” which features the single “Sweet & Loco”.

References

1997 births
Living people
21st-century Trinidad and Tobago women singers
21st-century Trinidad and Tobago singers
People from San Fernando, Trinidad and Tobago

External links